The Schütte-Lanz D.IV was a German fighter prototype during World War I. It was developed in parallel with the Schütte-Lanz D.III, however the two fighters had nothing in common. The D.IV was made of wood and was a single-bay staggered biplane with N-type interplane struts and ailerons on both upper and lower mainplanes. It first flew in late 1917 and was found to be inferior to the Schütte-Lanz D.III, and as a result production was not started.

A second prototype, designated D.IVa, was built with minor improvements including a frontal radiator and revised undercarriage. A proposed derivative of the D.IV with a Mercedes D.III fitted with a Brown Boveri compressor, designated D.V, was axed in May 1918 and remained a paper project only.

Specifications

Notes

Bibliography

Further reading

1910s German fighter aircraft
D.IV
Aircraft first flown in 1917